Punta Chueca is a Seri town located on the Gulf of California in the Mexican state of Sonora. It is located 25 kilometers north of the fishing and tourist town of Bahía de Kino. Both of these towns are part of the Municipality of Hermosillo. One of the two villages on the Seri Indian communal property (the other being El Desemboque (Haxöl Iihom)), it has small stores, a primary school and a small satellite-fed secondary school (telesecundaria). It is one of the closest points on the mainland to Tiburón Island, separated from it by the Canal del Infiernillo (Xepe Coosot). According to the Mexican census of 2010, the town (officially a locality, or localidad), had a population of 520 inhabitants.

Gallery

References

Populated places in Sonora
Seri
Gulf of California
Hermosillo
Lands inhabited by indigenous peoples
Lands reserved for indigenous peoples